Tsakane is a township located in Ekurhuleni, Gauteng, South Africa. It was established during the early 1960s due to Apartheid's segregationist policies and was formally founded as a designated area. Tsakane is a Tsonga word which means joy or happiness.

During the 2011 Census the population of Tsakane consisted of Black Africans (134,342), Coloureds (539), Whites (28), Indian/Asians (216) - 135,994 in total. The languages that are spoken are as follows: IsiZulu, Sotho, Xhosa, Setswana, Xitsonga, Ndebele and English. Tsakane is divided into different extensions: 1, 11, 12, 13, 15, 16, 17, 19, 5, 8, 9 and 22. Some of the Public schools in the area are Mamellong Comprehensive school & J.E Malepe Secondary school.

Health Services 
Tsakane has one public hospital called Pholosong. The hospital serves a population of 900,000 people from Tsakane, KwaThema and Duduza. There is one public clinic and other smaller surgeries and clinics in the township that take care of the health of the people around the township of Tsakane. Clinics help patients with health issues such as high blood pressure, cancer, HIV/AIDS blood tests and treatment, etc.

Economic Development 
Economic development in Tsakane is centred in the area around the mall which also accommodates the police station, the Magistrates court, the stadium and the Municipal offices. There are 4 Shoprite stores in Tsakane and the malls and shopping complexes are forever busy throughout the week especially around the end of the month. There is a range of housing in Tsakane. Residences range from middle class houses (Ext 1,5,8 & 11) normal houses (central) to RDP houses (Mandela village, Ext 9,12,13,15 & 19).

Lifestyle 
Tsakane has two shopping centers,  Tsakane Corner and The Square, and other smaller shopping centers which are located in different sections of the township: Duduza Rank, Extension 11 and Extension 19. Tsakane mall is not very big but has many stores and banks. Two well known supermarkets in the mall that most people buy food from are Shoprite and Spar. Shoprite is also found in the other two shopping centers: Extension 11 and Extension 19 shopping centers. There are fast-food restaurants, clubs such as Dinangwe, Siyas Lounge and Tight Corner and other places that people go to on special occasions, such as on public holidays. Tsakane also boasts an active night life with bars such as: Chillas, Dinangwe and Welcome's place. The people of Tsakane like to eat out and support their local township food businesses which sell bunny chow or "kota" as it is referred to.

Sports and Leisure 
Tsakane has one major stadium, Tsakane Stadium. The stadium is not large enough to host matches between big soccer teams like Orlando Pirates and Kaizer Chiefs. Although lately the stadium has hosted some matches between the reserve teams of these big cubs in a tournament called the Diski Challenge. In addition to soccer games, the stadium is also often used for local activities such as government functions, school sports days, music festivals and religious gatherings.

Education 
There are several Primary and Secondary Schools in Tsakane. Primary schools in Tsakane mostly start from Grade 1-7 whereas the secondary schools start from Grade 8 to 12 except for African School for Excellence which is the only secondary school that starts from grade 7 in the area as well as being the only Cambridge School in that area.

Michael Mkwanazi Primary School 
Sizuzile Primary School

The African School for Excellence 
The African School for Excellence (ASE) is currently the only private school located in Tsakane. The ASE model was designed specifically to address the needs and challenges of township secondary school scholars. The main difference between it and government public schools in Tsakane is that ASE uses the Cambridge curriculum.

Communication, Arts and Culture

Radio Station 
Tsakane has one community radio station called EK FM 103.6. The radio station serves as a community development and communication media for Tsakane, Kwathema, Duduza and Daveyton communities.

Newspaper 
Tsakane has a local newspaper: The African Reporter. The African Reporter is a weekly newspaper distributed on Fridays across the East Rand with an estimated circulation of 22,000 newspapers.

Magazine 
Tsakane also has a local magazine.

References

Townships in Gauteng
Populated places in Ekurhuleni